Ilasco Historic District is a national historic district located at Ilasco, Ralls County, Missouri.  The district encompasses two contributing buildings and one contributing structure in the unincorporated community of Ilasco.  It developed about 1909–1910, and includes a jail, a one-story commercial building with two storefronts, and a Pratt pony truss bridge.

It was listed on the National Register of Historic Places in 2016.

References

Historic districts on the National Register of Historic Places in Missouri
Buildings and structures in Ralls County, Missouri
National Register of Historic Places in Ralls County, Missouri
Grocery store buildings